Andrei Nikolayevich Nikolayev (born 27 March 1938) is a Russian clown, artistic director and teacher.

Biography
Nikolayev graduated from the State School of Circus in 1958, and from the Russian Academy of Theatre Arts in 1973 with an artistic director degree. During his early career he assisted Karandash and Emil Kio, but since 1960s performed on his own. In 1978 he became head of the group "Komediinyi Tsirk" (Comedy Cricus) and designed the spectacles I work as a clown (1978) and Topsy-turvy (1987), where he also played leading roles. In the 1990s he wrote several award-winning compositions for other clowns, including his son Andrei Nikolayev Jr. (1966–2007). 

Nikolayev was awarded Grock d'or in 1969 and became People's Artist of Russia in 1979. Since 1976 he lectures at the Russian Academy of Theatre Arts.

References

1938 births
Living people
Russian clowns